The San Rafael Glacier is one of the major outlet glaciers of the Northern Patagonian Ice Field in southern Chile and is the tidewater glacier nearest the equator. It calves into the Laguna San Rafael and is contained within Laguna San Rafael National Park.

See also
List of glaciers

References

External links

Patagonian ice in rapid retreat BBC News Online
Space Radar Image of San Rafael Glacier, Chile NASA Visible Earth

Glaciers of Aysén Region